Somebody's Gonna Miss Us is a two-disc live/video album by The Starting Line consisting of material that was recorded during the band's final hometown show at the Electric Factory in Philadelphia, Pennsylvania.  The set features a full-length concert and an exclusive documentary following the band throughout the tour.

History
In December 2008, it was announced that the band would release a video album, titled Somebody's Gonna Miss Us, early next year. On August 13, 2009, The Starting Line announced the release of a CD/DVD album. The album was recorded in 2008 during the band's farewell tour.

Track listing

Personnel 
Kenny Vasoli - lead vocals, bass guitar
Matt Watts – rhythm guitar, backing vocals
Mike Golla – lead guitar, backing vocals
Tom Gryskiewicz – drums, percussion
Brian Schmutz – keyboards, backing vocals

References

2009 albums
The Starting Line albums